The 1st Division was a unit of the Finnish Army during the Continuation War.

History
The division was initially formed from reservists of the Lounais-Suomi military district and was intended to be used as the reserve of the General Headquarters. Before the onset of the war, one of its component regiments, Infantry Regiment 14, was transferred to the Åland islands under the command of the navy as part of Operation Kilpapurjehdus. The 14th regiment was replaced by Infantry Regiment 60.

During the war, the 1st Division took part in the invasion of East Karelia as a component of the Finnish VII Corps that captured the city of Petrozavodsk. Later in the war, the division was transferred to the II Corps.

Notable members 
 Lauri Törni

See also
 List of Finnish divisions in the Continuation War
 Finnish 1st Division (Winter War)

Notes

References 
 Leskinen, Jari, and Antti Juutilainen, eds. Jatkosodan pikkujättiläinen. WSOY, 2005.
 Vaura, Ilkka. "Turkulaisen ”Tunturirykmentin” erikoinen sotatie alkoi 80 vuotta sitten". Turun Sanomat, 20 June 2021, https://www.ts.fi/puheenvuorot/5344591/Turkulaisen+Tunturirykmentin+erikoinen+sotatie+alkoi+80+vuotta+sitten. Accessed 23 September 2021.
 Santa, Matti. JR 60:n Vaiheet. JR 56 ja JR 60 Kilta ry, n.d., http://web.jr56jajr60.fi/publichtml/index.php/jr60/. Accessed 23 September 2021.

Continuation War
Divisions of Finland
Military units and formations of Finland in World War II
Military units and formations disestablished in 1944